Joel Johnson may refer to:
Joel J. Johnson (1923–2009), Pennsylvania politician
Joel Johnson (communications strategist) (born 1961), American businessman
Joel T. Johnson (born 1936), Nebraska politician
Joel H. Johnson (1802–1883), Latter-day Saint missionary and hymn writer
Joel Johnson (Michigan politician) (born 1958), member of the Michigan House of Representatives
Joel Johnson (journalist), American journalist and media personality
Joel Johnson (ice hockey), American ice hockey coach
Joel Johnson (footballer) (Joel Johnson Alajarín, born 1992), Liberian footballer
Joel Johnson (athlete) (born 2000), Bahamian sprinter

See also
Joe Johnson (disambiguation)
Joel Johnston (born 1967), baseball player